MV Skookum, also known as Tut Tut and not to be confused with , was a ferry that operated on Okanagan Lake in British Columbia, Canada starting on April 2, 1906. She was the first official, government-subsidized ferry on the lake to connect the communities of Kelowna and Westbank. 

She had a capacity of 20 passengers and would charge 25 cents per passenger or one dollar per horse. If the scow was needed, the customer would build two fires on the West side of the lake as a signal. Skookum was granted a CAD$1000 per year subsidy to run two round trips daily, except Sundays, for three years. 

In 1907, the ferry charter was bought by Captain Len A. Hayman, who continued the service until 1911, when the Okanagan Lake Boat Company, owned by Peter Roe, took her over. Roe and his brothers, Fred and Gerald, then operated Skookum and another ship, for many years.

References

Ferries of British Columbia
History of British Columbia
Culture of the Okanagan